APOE may refer to:
Apolipoprotein E, a main apoprotein of the chylomicron, also studied for its involvement in Alzheimer's disease risk.
Professional Oklahoma Educators, an organization in Oklahoma formerly known as the Association of Professional Oklahoma Educators or APOE.